Lotfabad District is a district (bakhsh) in Dargaz County, Razavi Khorasan Province, Iran. At the 2006 census, its population was 10,374, in 2,709 families.  The district has one city: Lotfabad.  The district has two rural districts (dehestan): Dibaj Rural District and Zangelanlu Rural District.

References 

Districts of Razavi Khorasan Province
Dargaz County